Glenn Donaldson is a New Zealand former rugby league footballer who played in the 1980s and 1990s.

Playing career
Donaldson represented the Bay of Plenty and Northern Districts. In 1986 he was selected for the New Zealand national rugby league team but did not play a test match for the side. He played for the Bay of Plenty until 1991.

In 2011 he competed in a charity boxing match against a former Bay of Plenty Steamers rugby union representative.

References

Living people
New Zealand rugby league players
New Zealand national rugby league team players
Bay of Plenty rugby league team players
Northern Districts rugby league team players
Rugby league halfbacks
Year of birth missing (living people)